Hampton Academy may refer to:

Hampton Academy (London), a school in London, UK.
New Hampton School, an independent college preparatory high school located in New Hampton, New Hampshire.
Winnacunnet High School, former Hampton Academy and High School, located in Hampton, New Hampshire.